Willem Hugo Hudig (30 May 1894 – 1 July 1970) was a Dutch rower. He competed in the men's eight event at the 1920 Summer Olympics.

References

External links
 

1894 births
1970 deaths
Dutch male rowers
Olympic rowers of the Netherlands
Rowers at the 1920 Summer Olympics
Sportspeople from Rotterdam